The 13th edition of the annual Holland Ladies Tour was held from August 31 to September 5, 2010. The women's stage race with an UCI rating of 2.2 started in Nuenen, and finished in Hellendoorn.

Stages

2010-08-31: Nuenen — Gerwen (112 km)

2010-09-01: Leende — Leende (107 km)

2010-09-02: Gieten — Gieten (108 km)

2010-09-03: Diepenheim — Diepenheim (97 km)

2010-09-04: Rijssen — Rijssen (80.4 km)

2010-09-04: Rijssen — Rijssen (12.9 km)

2010-09-05: Hellendoorn — Hellendoorn (121.5 km)

Final standings

General Classification

References 
 Wielerland
 CQ ranking

2010
Holland Ladies Tour
Holland Ladies Tour
Cycling in Overijssel
Cycling in Aa en Hunze
Cycling in Heeze-Leende
Cycling in Hellendoorn
Cycling in Nuenen, Gerwen en Nederwetten
Sport in Hof van Twente
Sport in Rijssen-Holten